The 2000 All-Big 12 Conference football team consists of American football players chosen as All-Big 12 Conference players for the 2000 Big 12 Conference football season.  The conference recognizes two official All-Big 12 selectors: (1) the Big 12 conference coaches selected separate offensive and defensive units and named first- and second-team players (the "Coaches" team); and (2) a panel of sports writers and broadcasters covering the Big 12 also selected offensive and defensive units and named first- and second-team players (the "Media" team).

Offensive selections

Quarterbacks

 Josh Heupel, Oklahoma (Coaches-1; Media-1)
 Kliff Kingsbury, Texas Tech (Coaches-2)
 Eric Crouch, Nebraska (Media-2)

Running backs

 Ennis Haywood, Iowa State (Coaches-1; Media-1)
 Hodges Mitchell, Texas (Coaches-1; Media-1)
 Dan Alexander, Nebraska (Coaches-1; Media-2)
 David Winbush, Kansas (Coaches-2)
 Quentin Griffin, Oklahoma (Coaches-2)
 Ja’Mar Toombs, Texas A&M (Coaches-2)
 Reggie White, Oklahoma State (Media-2)

Centers

 Dominic Raiola, Nebraska (Coaches-1; Media-1)
 Randall Cummins, Nebraska (Coaches-1; Media-2)
 Seth McKinney, Texas A&M (Coaches-1; Media-2)
 Ben Bruns, Iowa State (Coaches-2; Media-1)

Guards

 Andre Gurode, Colorado (Coaches-1; Media-2)
 Russ Hochstein, Nebraska (Coaches-2; Media-1)
 Toniu Fonoti, Nebraska (Coaches-2; Media-2)

Tackles

 Leonard Davis, Texas (Coaches-1; Media-1)
 Frank Romero, Oklahoma (Coaches-2; Media-1)
 Milford Stephenson, Kansas State (Coaches-2)
 Scott Kempenich, Oklahoma (Media-2)

Tight ends

 Tracey Wistrom, Nebraska (Coaches-1; Media-1)
 Daniel Graham, Colorado (Coaches-2; Media-2)

Receivers

 Quincy Morgan, Kansas State (Coaches-1; Media-1)
 Robert Ferguson, Texas A&M (Coaches-1; Media-1)
 J. J. Moses, Baylor (Coaches-2; Media-2)
 Antwone Savage, Oklahoma (Coaches-2)
 Tim Baker, Texas Tech (Media-2)

Defensive selections

Defensive linemen

 Mario Fatafehi, Kansas State (Coaches-1; Media-1)
 Casey Hampton, Texas (Coaches-1; Media-1)
 Justin Smith, Missouri (Coaches-1; Media-1)
 Ryan Fisher, Oklahoma (Coaches-1; Media-2)
 Monty Beisel, Kansas State (Coaches-2; Media-1)
 Reggie Hayward, Iowa State (Coaches-2; Media-2)
 Nate Dwyer, Kansas (Coaches-2)
 Pat Mingucci, Missouri (Coaches-2)
 Kris Kocurek, Texas Tech (Coaches-2)
 Chris Johnson, Kansas State (Media-2)
 Kyle Vanden Bosch, Nebraska (Media-2)

Linebackers

 Rocky Calmus, Oklahoma (Coaches-1; Media-1)
 Carlos Polk, Nebraska (Coaches-1; Media-1)
 Jason Glenn, Texas A&M (Coaches-1; Media-1)
 Torrance Marshall, Oklahoma (Coaches-2; Media-1)
 Ben Leber, Kansas State (Coaches-2; Media-2)
 Lawrence Flugence, Texas Tech (Media-2)
 Brian Gamble, Texas A&M (Media-2)
 D. D. Lewis, Texas (Media-2)

Defensive backs

 J. T. Thatcher, Oklahoma (Coaches-1; Media-1)
 Roy Williams, Oklahoma (Coaches-1; Media-1)
 Jerametrius Butler, Kansas State (Coaches-1; Media-2)
 Quentin Jammer, Texas (Coaches-1; Media-2)
 Gary Baxter, Baylor (Coaches-2; Media-1)
 Kevin Curtis, Texas Tech (Coaches-2; Media-1)
 Dyshod Carter, Kansas State (Coaches-2; Media-2)
 Carl Nesmith, Kansas (Coaches-2; Media-2)

Special teams

Kickers

 Jamie Rheem, Kansas State (Coaches-1; Media-2)
 Kris Stockton, Texas (Coaches-2; Media-1)

Punters

 Dan Hadenfeldt, Nebraska (Coaches-1; Media-2)
 Jeff Ferguson, Oklahoma (Coaches-2; Media-1)

All-purpose / Return specialists

 Aaron Lockett, Kansas State (Coaches-1; Media-1)
 J. J. Moses, Iowa State (Coaches-1)
 J. T. Thatcher, Oklahoma (Coaches-2; Media-1)
 Jamaal Fobbs, Oklahoma State (Coaches-2)

Key
Bold = selected as a first-team player by both the coaches and media panel

Coaches = selected by Big 12 Conference coaches

Media = selected by a media panel

See also
2000 College Football All-America Team

References

All-Big 12 Conference
All-Big 12 Conference football teams